You're So Cool may refer to

 You're So Cool (manhwa), manhwa published 2002-2008

Songs 
 "You're So Cool" (The Cyclones song), 1981
 "You're So Cool" (Mark Williams ZNZ song), 1993
 "You're So Cool" (Hans Zimmer song), theme for the 1993 film True Romance
 "You're So Cool" (Taking Back Sunday song), 2006
 "You're So Cool" (The Orion Experience song), 2008
 "You're So Cool" (Patty Loveless song), 2009
 "You're So Cool" (Roger Shah song), 2009
 "You're So Cool" (Tyler Rix song), 2009
 "You're So Cool" (Streamer Bendy song), 2010
 "You're So Cool" (The History of Apple Pie song), 2013
 "You're So Cool" (Jonathan Bree song), 2017
 "You're So Cool" (Muskets song), 2017
 "You're So Cool" (Tate McRae song), 2022
 "Baby You're So Cool", 1997 Espen Lind song
 "You're So Cool, I'm So Freaky", 2013 Kate Nash song